Perama is a town and a former municipality in the Ioannina regional unit, Epirus, Greece. Since the 2011 local government reform it is part of the municipality Ioannina, of which it is a municipal unit. It lies about 4 km north of central Ioannina.  The town's name means "passage" and it lies on the northern edge of lake Pamvotis (Greek Παμβώτις). It is famous for its cave, known as the "Cave of Perama" (Greek Σπήλαιον Περάματος). The cave, extending five kilometres below the ground and having been explored fully only up to one kilometre, has a remarkable arrangement of stalagmites and stalactites. An 11th-century church in the town dedicated to Saint Haralambos and reputedly built by Byzantine Emperor Alexius Comnenus is in a bad state of repair and is rarely open to the general public. The town lies on GR-6 between Igoumenitsa and Metsovo.

The municipal unit has an area of 105.725 km2, the community 7.597 km2. The municipal unit has a population of 4,749 inhabitants (2011). Its largest settlements are Pérama (pop. 1,841), Amfithéa (594), Perívleptos (473), Krýa (434), Agía Marína (388), and Kranoúla (310).

References

External links
Official website 
Perama Cave website 

Populated places in Ioannina (regional unit)